Fistulinella is a genus of bolete fungi in the family Boletaceae. The genus has a pantropical distribution, and contains 15 species. Fistulinella  was circumscribed by German mycologist Paul Christoph Hennings in 1901.

Species

References

External links

Boletaceae
Boletales genera
Taxa named by Paul Christoph Hennings